The waterline is where the hull of a ship meets the surface of the water, it is also a special marking indicating the legal load limit of a ship, and, in naval architectural plans, it is any line drawn to delineate hull shape that is in a plane parallel to the surface of the water.

Waterline or water line may also refer to:
 Water supply network, a system of pipes for supplying potable water to buildings across the landscape
 1:700 scale Waterline series of scale model ships

Music
 Waterlines (album)
 "Waterline" (song), a 2012 Jedward song
 "Waterline", a song from The Icicle Works (album)
 "Waterline", a 1990 song by Lloyd Cole Lloyd Cole (album)